Sir Robert McDowall Gray (2 July 1931 – 2 April 2022), generally known as Robin Gray, was a New Zealand politician. He was an MP from 1978 to 1996, and served as Speaker of the House of Representatives between 1990 and 1993.

Early life and family
Gray was born in Borgue, Kirkcudbrightshire, Scotland on 2 July 1931. He received his education at Borgue Primary School and at George Watson's Boys College. After serving with the 4th/7th Royal Dragoon Guards from 1949 to 1951 in Africa, he migrated to New Zealand in 1952 to take up farming, initially working on a farm at Tapanui, before moving to his own property at Waitahuna, Central Otago. Gray became a naturalised New Zealand citizen in 1973.

Gray married Mary Muir Thomson in 1957. She was the daughter of Alexander Thomson. The couple went on to have three children. Gray was widowed by the death of his wife, Mary, in 1981.

Member of Parliament

He joined the National Party in 1956, and held a number of positions in its internal hierarchy. In the 1978 election, he was elected to replace Peter Gordon as MP for Clutha, a safe National seat that practically guaranteed election. He was elected in 1978 and held the electorate until the 1996 election, when it was abolished and he retired.

Gray became the National Party's Junior Whip in 1985 and the Senior Whip in 1987.

Speaker of the House of Representatives
When National won office in the 1990 election, Gray was made Speaker of the House of Representatives. After the 1993 election, however, the National Party held a majority of only a single seat – as the Speaker could not vote, re-appointing Gray to the Speakership would leave Parliament deadlocked. National therefore offered the Speakership to Peter Tapsell of the Labour Party. Gray was appointed to the sinecure of Minister of State, and also became Associate Minister of Foreign Affairs.

In the 1994 New Year Honours, Gray was appointed a Knight Bachelor.

As Speaker of the House of Representatives, Gray was entitled to the title of The Honourable, and he was granted use of the honorific for the rest of his life in 1994.

Life after Parliament
After stepping down as an MP, Gray retired to Mosgiel, but continued to make occasional appearances and commentary at various conferences around New Zealand. He was mildly critical of the National Party for failing to promote members' interests at conferences, to which he achieved a degree of success in ensuring delegates had more opportunity for engagement at the formal meetings.

Gray was the founding president on the board of trustees for the New Zealand Business and Parliament Trust. He died at his home in Mosgiel on 2 April 2022.

Freemason
Gray was active as a Freemason from the 1950s. He was initiated at Kirkcudbright the day before he left for New Zealand. He joined the lodge at Tapanui after arriving in New Zealand, before transferring to Lawrence in 195, where he rose to become master in 1971. After retiring from farming, he transferred to Lodge St John 84 in Mosgiel in 1995, and was appointed grand lecturer the following year.

References

|-

1931 births
2022 deaths
People from Dumfries and Galloway
People educated at George Watson's College
Scottish emigrants to New Zealand
Naturalised citizens of New Zealand
Members of the Cabinet of New Zealand
New Zealand farmers
New Zealand National Party MPs
Speakers of the New Zealand House of Representatives
Members of the New Zealand House of Representatives
People from Mosgiel
New Zealand Knights Bachelor
New Zealand MPs for South Island electorates
New Zealand politicians awarded knighthoods
20th-century British Army personnel
New Zealand Freemasons